The 1949 United States gubernatorial elections were held on 8 November 1949, in two states. In New Jersey, the governor was elected to a 4-year term for the first time, instead of a 3-year term.

Results

Notes

References

 
Gubernatorial elections